Slaggyford was a railway station on the Alston Line, which ran between Haltwhistle and Alston. The station served the village of Slaggyford in Northumberland.

There were a number of unscheduled calling points on the section of the line between Slaggyford and Lambley, including those at Whitwham, Softley and Burnstones. Trains regularly stopped to allow passengers to board and alight, despite no platform or facilities being available at these locations.

Following a 42-year closure, the station reopened in June 2018, as part of the South Tynedale Railway.

History
The Newcastle and Carlisle Railway was formed in 1829, opening to passengers in stages from March 1835. A branch line from Haltwhistle to Alston and Nenthead was first considered in 1841, with the line authorised by an Act of Parliament in August 1846. It was later decided that a line operating as far as Alston was sufficient, with the amended route approved by a further Act in July 1849. 

In March 1851, the 4½-mile section from Haltwhistle to Shaft Hill (which was later renamed Coanwood) was opened to goods traffic, with passenger services commencing in July 1851. The 8¼-mile section of the line between Alston and Lambley opened to goods traffic in January 1852, along with a short branch to Lambley Fell, with passenger services commencing in May 1852.

Construction of the branch line was completed in November 1852, following the opening of the, now Grade II* listed, Lambley Viaduct over the River South Tyne.

Demise and closure
Slaggyford, along with Featherstone Park, was reduced to unstaffed halt status in 1954. Coanwood followed closely after, becoming an unstaffed halt in 1955. 

The line was originally marked for closure in the 1960s, under the Beeching plan, however the lack of an all-weather road kept it open. Following improvements to the road network, including a temporary level crossing over the branch at Lambley, the line was closed on 3 May 1976 by the British Railways Board, with the last train working two days earlier. The line was replaced in part by a bus service, which was operated by Ribble Motor Services.

South Tynedale Railway

In June 2018, the station reopened as part of the South Tynedale Railway. The narrow-gauge heritage railway operates along a  section of the former Alston Line, which closed to passengers in May 1976. The railway serves former stations at Slaggyford and Alston, as well as purpose-built stations at Lintley Halt and Kirkhaugh.

See also 
 Slaggyford
 South Tynedale Railway

References

External links
 Video footage of Slaggyford Railway Station.
 

Disused railway stations in Northumberland
Former North Eastern Railway (UK) stations
Railway stations in Great Britain closed in 1976
Railway stations in Great Britain opened in 1852
1852 establishments in England
Beeching closures in England